The Cabinet of Ministers was the supreme state body established on November 4, 1731 by the decree of Empress Anna Ioannovna. On December 23, 1741, after the accession of Elizabeth Petrovna, it lost its powers and was transformed into the Personal Office of the Empress. In 1756, its functions were transferred to the Conference at the Highest Court.

History
Having come to power in 1730, Anna Ioannovna, instead of the Supreme Privy Council, restored the Senate. Shortly after the abolition of the Privy Council, Anna Ioannovna, by a decree  of November 17, 1731, established the Cabinet of Ministers.

In 1735 a decree was issued, which the signature of the three cabinet ministers equated to the Imperial signature.

During the reign of Anna Leopoldovna, under the influence of Minich, the Cabinet was divided into 3 departments:
Count Burkhard von Münnich, in the rank of First Minister, was in charge of the army, cadet corps and affairs on the Ladoga Canal;
Count Andrey Osterman — external relations and fleet;
Prince Alexey Cherkassky and Count Mikhail Golovkin were provided with "everything that relates to the interior of the Senate and the Synod, and state fees for the chamber board and other incomes, commerce, justice and other things to which they belong".

Separate cabinet ministers, in charge of their departments, single-handedly decided matters in them, communicating only "for coordination" their opinion to other ministers. Only particularly important matters should be decided by the general council. In its new form, the Cabinet did not exist for long: following the accession of Elizaveta Petrovna to the Throne, it was abolished by a decree: "On the restoration of the internal state bodies; on the composition of the register, the decree of the former kingdoms, which the use of the State is repugnant of; the destruction of the former Cabinet, and the installation of the new at the Court of Her Imperial Majesty; the establishment in the Governorate Prosecutor, the scope of which is defined for management by the foreign staff of the Chancellor" of December 23, 1741.

Composition
The Cabinet consisted of three cabinet ministers (of two — from April 17, 1736 to February 14, 1738, from April 23, 1740 to August 29, 1740, after December 6, 1741, and of the four from November 1741 to March 14, 1741). It constantly included Andrey Osterman and Alexey Cherkassky, and also, replacing each other, Gavriil Golovkin, Pavel Yaguzhinsky, Artemy Volynsky, Alexey Bestuzhev-Ryumin, Mikhail Golovkin and Burkhard von Münnich (the last — the fourth cabinet minister).

Cabinet Ministers alphabetically:
Alexey Bestuzhev-Ryumin — from August 29, 1740 to November 19, 1740 (arrested);
Artemy Volynsky — from February 14, 1738 to April 23, 1740 (arrested);
Gavriil Golovkin — from November 21, 1731 to January 31, 1734;
Mikhail Golovkin — soon after November 19, 1740 to December 6, 1741 (arrested);
Burkhard von Münnich — from shortly after November 19, 1740 to March 14, 1741;
Andrey Osterman — from November 21, 1731 to December 23, 1741;
Alexey Cherkassky — from November 21, 1731 to December 23, 1741;
Pavel Yaguzhinsky — from January 31, 1734 to April 17, 1736 (died in the post of cabinet minister).

Sources
Cabinet of Ministers of the Russian Empire

References

1731 establishments in Europe
Government of the Russian Empire